2 is a 2001 album recorded by French singer Florent Pagny. It was his seventh studio album and was released on December 17, 2001. It achieved success in France and Belgium (Wallonia), where it hit #3, and in Switzerland where it peaked at #8. This album is composed of cover versions of popular songs in French or English, and covers of Pagny's previous songs, but as the title suggests, these songs were overdubbed as duets with many notable artists such as David Hallyday, Calogero, Pascal Obispo and Patrick Bruel. It provided a sole single, "L'air du temps", recorded with Cécilia Cara, which was #20 in France and #19 in Belgium (Wallonia).

Track listing

Source : Allmusic.

Charts

Certifications

Release history

References

2001 albums
Covers albums
Florent Pagny albums
Universal Music France albums
Mercury Records albums
French-language albums